Südermarsch is a municipality in the district of Nordfriesland, in Schleswig-Holstein, Germany.

References

Nordfriesland